Lionel Sainsbury is an English pianist and classical composer.

Biography  
Born in Wiltshire in 1958, he started playing piano as a child, and soon started to compose his own music. Later he studied at the Guildhall School of Music and Drama in London, with Patric Standford for composition and Edith Vogel for piano. In 1979, he received the British Mendelssohn Scholarship and met with Edmund Rubbra, John McCabe and Henri Dutilleux in Paris.

Major works

References

External links 
 Official site
  Lionel Sainsbury on Allmusic.com

1958 births
Living people
English classical composers
Mendelssohn Prize winners
English male classical composers